CGE is a utility company based in Chile, operates in the sectors of electricity, natural gas and other services and is listed on the Santiago Stock Exchange.

References

Electric power companies of Chile
1905 establishments in Chile
Companies listed on the Santiago Stock Exchange